Mingala Taungnyunt Township (also spelled Mingalar Taung Nyunt) is a township of Yangon, Myanmar. Located in the east-central part of the city, the township consists of 20 wards, and shares borders with Dagon Township in the west, Bahan township in the north, Botataung Township in the south, Kyauktada Township in the southwest, and the Pazundaung Creek and Dawbon Township in the east.

With nearly 100,000 residents, it is one of the most populous townships in the city. Mingala Taungnyunt has 22 primary schools, two middle schools and six high schools.

Landmarks
Yangon Central Railway Station and Aung San Stadium are located on the western side of the township, near downtown. Prominent shopping places like Yuzana Plaza and Mingalar market buildings are located in the township. It also hosts attractive parks like  Kandawgyi Nature Park and  Yangon Zoological Garden. Mingala Taungnyunt township was part of the original city plan laid out the British. Some of the buildings and structures of "architectural significance" are now designated landmarks by the Yangon City Development Committee.

References

Townships of Yangon